Seymur Baycan – an Azerbaijani writer, publicist, columnist.

Life 

Seymur Baycan was born in 1976, in Fizuli, Azerbaijan. He graduated from the military school named after Jamshid Nakhchivanski. He went on to study at Qafqaz University, Department of Public Administration. He left his education and started his literary career. His short stories have been published in Russian, Georgian, Armenian, Ukrainian and Kazakh languages. He created the novel-skeleton in world literature. His best-known works include 18.6 cm, Meat and meat products and Gugark.  In different years he published essays and columns in newspapers Milli yol, Reyting, Daily Azerbaijan, etc. He participated in several regional projects and delivered lectures on cultural topics.  Seymur Baycan was awarded with Media Key for his essay The Sunday in Paradise. He won the writing competition organized by Elmar Huseynov Foundation.

Bibliography 

 Nontraditional intercourse, 2003;
 Sparrows, 2003;
 Execution Day, 2004;
 Meat and meat products, 2005;
 18, 6 cm, (novel), 2007;
 Bridge builders, (novel), 2008;
 Gugark, (novel), 2011;
 My struggle I (collection of articles) 2013;
 Heart of Mother, (novel), 2013
 My struggle II, (collection of articles), 2014;
 The Happiest Day of My Life, (short stories), 2014;
 Articles published in Kulis, (collection of articles), 2014;
 My struggle III, (collection of articles), 2015;
 Return of unnamed dog, (novel), 2015;
 My struggle IV, (collection of articles), 2016;
 Fargana, (novel), 2016;

External links 
Russian
 В приграничном районе Грузии прошла презентация книг авторов из Армении и Азербайджана – kavkaz-uzel.ru
 Сеймур Байджан: "Власти Азербайджана сейчас в очень плохом положении" – azeri.ru
 «Гугарк» Сеймура Байджана – kultura.az
 Сеймур Байджан – regnum.ru – I
 Сеймур Байджан – regnum.ru – II

Azerbaijani

 Seymur Baycan. 1200 manatlıq kurtka... – azadlıq.org
 Oqtay Eloğlu toya neçəyə gedir? – azadlıq.org
 Axı niyə uşaqlarınızı boksa, güləşə yazdırırsınız? – azadlıq.org
 Seymur Baycan: Azərbaycanda mənə layiq qadın yoxdur – (müsahibə) – publika.az
 Seymur Baycan: Bu suala Tolikin yanında cavab verim? (müsahibə) – kultura.az
 Bakirə şairələr – kultura.az

Azerbaijani journalists
Azerbaijani translators
1976 births
Living people